The North Dakota State Bison college football team represents North Dakota State University as part of the Missouri Valley Football Conference (MVFC). The Bison competes as part of the NCAA Division I Football Championship Subdivision. The program has had 31 head coaches since it began play during the 1894 season. Since December 2018, Matt Entz has served as head coach at North Dakota State.

In that time, ten coaches have led North Dakota State to the postseason: Darrell Mudra, Ron Erhardt, Jim Wacker, Don Morton, Earle Solomonson, Rocky Hager, Bob Babich, Craig Bohl, Chris Klieman, and Entz. The Bison have also won 37 combined  conference championships: Casey Finnegan captured two, Mudra two, Erhardt six, Ev Kjelbertson two, Wacker two, Morton four, Solomonson two, and Hager five as a member of the North Central Conference; Bohl captured one as a member of the Great West Conference; Bohl captured three, Klieman five, and Entz two as a member of the MVFC. Mudra and Erhardt each captured College Division national championships; Morton and Solomonson each captured Division II national championships; and, Bohl, Klieman, and Entz each captured Football Bowl Subdivision national championships.

Finnegan is the leader in seasons coached with 13 and Bohl is the leader games won, with 104 victories. Gil Dobie has the highest winning percentage of those who have coached more than one game, with 1.000. Henry Luke Bolley has the lowest winning percentage of those who have coached more than one game, with .469. Of the 31 different head coaches who have led the Bison, Dobie and Mudra have been inducted into the College Football Hall of Fame.

Key

Coaches

Notes

References

North Dakota State Bison

North Dakota State Bison football coaches